Bangla Bachao ( Save Bengal) is a Bengali movie directed by Anup Sengupta, starring Prosenjit Chatterjee and Paoli Dam. The movie released on 28 January 2011.

Plot 
The movie "portrays the saga of Bengal politics and how the politicians have created a dangerous situation making it difficult for the people of Bengal to lead a peaceful life. The story of the film revolves around recent activities happening in Bengal."

Cast 

 Prosenjit Chatterjee, as Asutosh Sen
 Paoli Dam, as Mandira, a television news reported
 Kalyani Mandal, as Asutosh's mother
 Raja Chatterjee, as Anshu, the elder brother of Asutosh
 Mrinal Mukherjee, as a minister of the ruling party
 Dipankar De, as owner of a news channel
 Biswajit Chakraborty, as police commissioner
 Anamika Saha, as Maya Devi
 Saheb Bhattacharya, as Bishal
 Arpita, as Tina

References

External links

2011 films
Bengali-language Indian films
2010s Bengali-language films
Films directed by Anup Sengupta